Kirchdorf an der Amper is a municipality in the district of Freising in Bavaria Germany, on the Amper River.

References

Freising (district)